Li Xiangjun (1624–1654) was a courtesan, singer, and musician during the Ming dynasty. Her life was dramatised in the play The Peach Blossom Fan.

Biography
Li is referred to as Li Ji or Li Xiang in contemporary sources. To demonstrate respect for her, later scholars appended the character jun to her name. Her courtesy name was Shanzhui.

No written records from the time Li lived record where she was born, but popular modern theories suggest that she was the daughter of an official, who was demoted and his family either killed or sold. Li was adopted by the owner of a brothel in Nanjing called Meixiang House, whose surname she took. She was taught to dance, sing, paint, play music, and write poetry. Meixiang House was a favoured brothel of the literati and officials, with Li's adopted mother known for her generosity and chivalry. By age 13, Li was renowned for her singing and playing the pipa that her mistress charged 20 gold taels per guest to see her.

Li met Hou Fangyu at Meixiang House in 1648. Hou sent her poems and Li performed for him in return. When Hou left to sit the imperial examinations (which he failed), Li waited for him and refused to perform for the inspector general of Huaiyang County. Li's romance with Hou Fangyu has been called one of the greatest romances of Chinese history.

She is one of the Eight Beauties of Qinhuai described by late Qing officials. The other famed courtesans of this group are Ma Xianglan, Bian Yujing, Dong Xiaowan, Liu Rushi, Gu Mei, Kou Baimen, and Chen Yuanyuan.

Residence

The residence of Li Xiangjun is open to the public as part of Nanjing's literary cultural heritage. It is located in Nanjing, in the vicinity of Fuzimiao on the Qinhuai River.

References

Notes

Works cited

1624 births
1654 deaths
17th-century Chinese poets
Chinese women poets
Poets from Jiangsu
Ming dynasty poets
Writers from Suzhou
Qing dynasty poets
17th-century Chinese women
17th-century Chinese people
Eight Beauties of Qinhuai
17th-century Chinese women singers